Vera Manuel (March 20, 1948 – January 22, 2010, Secwepemc-Ktunaxa), was a playwright, poet, writer, healer and educator in British Columbia, Canada. Her native name was Kulilu Paⱡki (Butterfly Woman). Her plays were produced both in Canada and the United States.

Biography
She was the first daughter of cultural leader Marceline Paul (Ktunaxa) and George Manuel, Sr (Secwepemc). Both her parents were survivors of the Canadian Indian residential school system.  Manuel grew up on the Neskonlith reserve in the interior of British Columbia. She lived for many years as an adult in coastal Vancouver, Canada. She died there in January 2010, aged 61.

Manuel worked in diverse communities across North America. She wrote and produced numerous plays exploring cultural oppression and genocide in First Nations communities. She worked both independently and through Storytellers Theatre of Cookeville, Tennessee, writing and producing The Strength of Indian Women and Every Warrior's Song. Her poetry and short stories were published in journals and anthologies, and—like her plays—performed in spoken word events at a variety of venues across Canada and the United States.

Her play, Strength of Indian Women was staged throughout North America. It was published in the book, Two Plays about Residential Schools (1998), along with one by Larry Loyie (Cree). Described by one critic as "beautiful in dramatic terms alone", Manuel's play has been staged as part of decolonization healing events across Canada.

Legacy and honours
Her work was honoured by inclusion at the Native American Women Playwrights Program, housed at Miaml University, in Oxford, Ohio.

Works
Plays
Song of the Circle, 1989
Honouring the Strength of Indian Women, 1992

References

External links
Books and other media 

 Beyond the Pale: Dramatic Writing from First Nations Writers & Writers of Colour, Yvette Nolan et al, 1996
 Two Plays about Residential Schools (Living Traditions, 1998)
 Monologues for Actors of Color, Women, Roberta Uno, ed. Routledge, 2000
 Survivor (2008; videopoem; Director, Doreen Manuel; Soundscape/composer, Sandy Scofield; Poem "Justice" by Vera Manuel)

Critical responses
 Native American Drama, A Critical Perspective, Christy Stanlake (Cambridge University Press), 2009
Footpaths & Bridges: Voices from the Native American Women Playwrights Archive, Shirley Huston-Findley & Rebecca Howard, eds. (University of Michigan Press), 2008
 The Native American Women Playwrights Archive: Adding Voices, Rebecca Howard
 "An Introduction to the North American Indian Drama Collection", Christy Stanlake
 A Companion to Twentieth Century American Drama, David Krasner, Blackwell, 2005

1949 births
2010 deaths
20th-century Canadian poets
Canadian women dramatists and playwrights
Canadian women poets
First Nations dramatists and playwrights
Secwepemc people
20th-century Canadian dramatists and playwrights
20th-century Canadian women writers
First Nations poets
First Nations women writers
20th-century First Nations writers